The Union-Castle Line was a British shipping line that operated a fleet of passenger liners and cargo ships between Europe and Africa from 1900 to 1977. It was formed from the merger of the Union Line and Castle Shipping Line.

It merged with Bullard King and Clan Line in 1956 to form British & Commonwealth Shipping, and then with South African Marine Corporation (commonly referred to as Safmarine) in 1973 to create International Liner Services, but maintained its separate identity throughout. Its shipping operations ceased in 1977.

Predecessor lines

The Union Line was founded in 1853 as the Southampton Steam Shipping Company to transport coal from South Wales to Southampton. It was renamed the Union Steam Collier Company and then the Union Steamship Company. In 1857, renamed the Union Line, it won a contract to carry mail to South Africa, mainly the Cape Colony.  The inaugural sailing of the Dane left Southampton on 15 September.

Meanwhile, Donald Currie had built up the Castle Packet Co. which traded to Calcutta round the Cape of Good Hope. This trade was substantially curtailed by the opening of the Suez Canal in 1869, and the Castle Line started to run to South Africa instead, later becoming the Castle Mail Packet Company.

In 1872 the Cape Colony gained responsible government and its first Prime Minister, John Molteno, ordered a re-negotiation of the country's mail services. In 1876, keen to avoid either of the two main companies gaining a monopoly on the country's shipping, he awarded the South African mail contract jointly to both the Castle Mail Packet Company and the Union Line. The contract included a condition that the two companies would not amalgamate, as well as other clauses to promote competition, such as alternating services and speed premiums. This competition led to their shipping services running at unprecedented speed and efficiency. The contract was eventually to expire however, and the period of intense competition was later to give way to co-operation, including transporting troops and military equipment during the Boer War. Finally, on 8 March 1900, the Union Line and Castle Shipping Line merged, creating the Union-Castle Mail Steamship Company, Ltd, with Castle Shipping Line taking over the fleet.

Union-Castle Line

Union-Castle named most of their ships with the suffix "Castle" in their names; the names of several inherited from the Union Line were changed to this scheme (for example, Galician became ) but others (such as ) retained their original name. They were well known for the lavender-hulled liners with red funnels topped in black, running on a rigid timetable between Southampton and Cape Town. Every Thursday at 4pm a Union-Castle Royal Mail Ship would leave Southampton bound for Cape Town. At the same time, a Union-Castle Royal Mail Ship would leave Cape Town bound for Southampton.  In 1922 the line introduced its Round Africa service, a nine-week voyage calling at twenty ports en route.  Alternate sailings travelled out via the Suez Canal and out via West Africa.

The combined line was bought by Royal Mail Line in 1911, but continued to operate as Union-Castle. Many of the line's vessels were requisitioned for service as troop ships or hospital ships in the First World War, and eight were sunk by mines or German U-boats. The Royal Mail Line ran into financial difficulties in the 1930s, culminating in the prosecution of its director Lord Kylsant, and Union-Castle Line became an independent company again with Vernon Thomson as Managing Director. Many vessels were again requisitioned in the Second World War. Three – , Carnarvon Castle, Dunvegan Castle became armed merchant cruisers.  (1939) was also first requisitioned as an armed merchant cruiser, but later served as an escort carrier.

After the war the line made good use of its three ships converted to troop transports to facilitate carrying the vast number of emigrants seeking new lives in East and South Africa.  When they ran out of berths the line set up its own internal travel agency to book passages on other lines and even air services.  The mail service to South Africa, curtailed during hostilities, recommenced with the sailing of Roxburgh Castle from Southampton on 2 January 1947.

British & Commonwealth, and International Liner Services

The company took over the King Line in 1949, and merged with Bullard King and Clan Line in 1956 to form British & Commonwealth Shipping. It merged with South African Marine Corporation in 1973 to create International Liner Services, but competition with air travel adversely affected its shipping activities, and cargo shipping rapidly became containerised. The final South African mail service arrived in Southampton on 24 October 1977, and International Liner Services withdrew from shipping in 1982. British & Commonwealth continued in other fields, and acquired Atlantic Computers in 1989, but accounting problems soon became apparent and British & Commonwealth was liquidated in 1990.

In the 1950s and 60s the line operated a fleet of fifteen ships, eight on the principal weekly mail run from Southampton to Cape Town.  Each ship could carry an average of two hundred First Class passengers and four hundred and fifty in Tourist Class.  Six of the remaining ships operated the monthly Round Africa service, sailing both clockwise and anti-clockwise round the continent.  The remaining ship operated a service carrying up to 750 Tourist Class passengers to Beira and back via the West Coast route every three months.

In December 1999 the Union-Castle name was revived for a millennium cruise; the P&O ship  was chartered for a 60-day cruise around Africa, and had its funnel repainted for the occasion.

The last few surviving Union-Castle Line ships were scrapped in the early 21st century, the former Kenya Castle in 2001, the former  in 2003, the former Dunnottar Castle in 2004, and finally  in 2005.

Ships

The initial Union fleet consisted of the colliers Union, Briton, Saxon, Norman and Dane.  In 1860 this was augmented by the much larger Cambrian.

At the time of the merger in 1900, the Union fleet included:
Arab (1879-1900), Briton (1897-1926), Falcon (1896-1942), Gaika (1896-1926),  (1899-1916), Galician (1900-1918),  (1897-1928), Gaul (1893-1906), German (2) (1898-1930), Goorkka (1897-1926), Goth (1893-1913), Greek (1893-1906), Guelph (1894-1913), Mexican (1883-1900), Moor (1881-1901), Norman (2) (1894-1926), Sabine (1895-1921),  (1900-1935), Scot (1891-1905), Spartan (1881-1900), Susquehanna (1896-1926), and Trojan (1880-1900), with Celt on order (renamed  before it came into service)
and the Castle Line fleet included:
Arundel Castle (3) (1894–1905), Avondale Castle (1897–1912), Braemar Castle (1) (1898–1924), Carisbrook Castle (1898–1922), Doune Castle (1890–1904), Dunolly Castle (1897–1905),  (1890–1913), Dunvegan Castle (1896–1923), Garth Castle (1880–1901), Harlech Castle (1894–1904), Hawarden Castle (1883–1904),  (1899–1931), Kinfauns Castle (2) (1899–1927), Lismore Castle (1891–1904),  (1883–1903),  (2) (1883–1906), Raglan Castle (1897–1905), Roslin Castle (2) (1883–1904), Tantallon Castle (2) (1894–1901), Tintagel Castle'' (1) (1896–1912)

References

Sources and further reading

External links
 
 
 Collection of Passenger Lists of the Union-Castle Line GG Archives
 Union-Castle Line History and Ephemera GG Archives

1853 establishments in the United Kingdom
1990 disestablishments in the United Kingdom
Defunct shipping companies of the United Kingdom
Maritime history of South Africa
Transport companies disestablished in 1990
Transport companies established in 1853